George W. Joyce   (1847–1895) was a professional baseball player, who played center field for the 1886 Washington Nationals. He played in one game for the Nationals that season and did not have an at-bat. It is not known whether he batted or fielded with either his left or right hand. Some games or websites list George Joyce as right-handed, however this is because of the lack of information on the player.

Professional career
George Joyce, at the age of 38-39 (unknown due to lack of birth date, only birth year), played on the Washington Nationals team that spanned from 1886-1889. He played center field during the only game of his career on August 14, 1886, against the Philadelphia Quakers, and never got up to bat. He was the second oldest player on the team, only behind Joe Start, and was at the time the oldest player to make his debut in the post-1876 major leagues as a position player.

References

 Nemec, David. The Rank and File of 19th Century Major League Baseball: Biographies of 1,084 Players, Owners, Managers and Umpires

External links

SABR article

1847 births
1895 deaths
Major League Baseball outfielders
Washington Nationals (1886–1889) players
19th-century baseball players
Baseball players from Washington, D.C.